Denis Arthur Haydon FRS (21 February 1930 – 29 November 1988) was a Professor of Membrane Biophysics at the University of Cambridge from 1980.

He was educated at Dartford Grammar School and King's College London (BSc; PhD).

He was made a Fellow of the Royal Society in 1975. He was also a Fellow of Trinity Hall, Cambridge where he was Vice-Master from 1978 to 1982.

References

1930 births
1988 deaths
People educated at Dartford Grammar School
Alumni of King's College London
Fellows of the Royal Society
Academics of the University of Cambridge
Fellows of Trinity Hall, Cambridge
British biophysicists